Divididos ("Divided") is an Argentine rock band. The band was formed in 1988 after the death of Luca Prodan and the consequent dissolution of the band Sumo. Ricardo Mollo (vocals, guitar) and Diego Arnedo (bass guitar) joined drummer Gustavo Collado to form a band named "La División" (The Division), which would be later called "Divididos".

Biography 
The group is dubbed La Aplanadora del Rock (The Leveller of Rock) and is known for mixing rock music with Argentine folk music, and cryptic, hard-to-get lyrics. The band started with a lukewarm reception on their debut album, 40 dibujos ahí en el piso (40 drawings there in the floor), which sounded like the British new wave of Sumo. However, soon the group rose to prominence in the history of Argentine rock, with the release in 1991 of the very different album Acariciando lo áspero (Caressing the rough), furtherly consolidated in 1993 with their politically committed next album La era de la boludez (The age of idiocy), and in 1995 with the psychedelic and experimental Otroletravaladna (flesruoykcuf).

Divididos was awarded with the Best Song of the 2000s for "Spaghetti del rock", and with the Best Album of the 2000s for Narigón del siglo, both won in a poll by the users of Rolling Stone Argentina. Furthermore, in 2010 on the list of Best 50 National Songs Of The Decade by a group of critics of Rolling Stone Argentina, "Spaghetti del rock" was awarded with the 5th place and "Par mil" with 21st place.

This consistent record led in 2005 to the award of the band with the Platinum Konex Award as the best Rock Group of the 1995–2005 decade, distinction shared with Patricio Rey y sus Redonditos de Ricota.

Other than founding members Mollo and Arnedo, different drummers have completed the normal trio: Gustavo Collado (1988–1990); Federico Gil Solá (1990–1995); Jorge Araujo (1995–2004); and since 2004, Catriel Ciavarella.

The band has recorded a number of covers, such as Voodoo Child by Jimi Hendrix and Light My Fire by The Doors. Covers not committed to CDs include I Want You (She's So Heavy) and Day Tripper by The Beatles. In their shows, Divididos has played songs such as "Rock and Roll" and "Moby Dick" (Led Zeppelin), and "Little Wing" (Jimi Hendrix). The band also covers some Sumo songs, usually in medley format.

Discography

Studio

Live

Compilation

References

See also
Official site 

Argentine rock music groups
Argentine musical trios